Ana Karylle Padilla Tatlonghari-Yuzon (born March 22, 1981), known mononymously as a Karylle, is a Filipino singer, actress, TV host and musical theatre performer. She is heralded as "OPMs Showbiz Royalty". She has received a nomination for the "Best Actress for TV Series-Drama" in one of Europe’s most prestigious television awards, the Monte-Carlo TV Festival. In 2002, she won "Best New Artist" at MTV Philippines. Her album titled "K" and debut album "Time to Shine" received a gold certification from PARI.  Her albums titled "Time for letting Go" & "Roadtrip" all reached Platinum status in the Philippines. She also took part in the International Emmy-nominated telenovela Dahil May Isang Ikaw.

She is a regular host and judge on ABS-CBN's noontime variety show It's Showtime.

Early life
Karylle was born on March 22, 1981, in Manila to Zsa Zsa Padilla, a singer-actress and Dr. Modesto Tatlonghari. She is the granddaughter of boxing referee Carlos Padilla Jr. Her parents separated when she was six years old. Karylle has two half-sisters Nicole and Zia Quizon from her mother's relationship to actor and comedian Dolphy a.k.a. Rodolfo Vera Quizon. Karylle completed her elementary and secondary education, notably in O.B. Montessori Center – Greenhills during grade school (where she was class valedictorian), and Poveda where she finished high school with a Service Medal for extra-curricular and volunteer works. She began taking formal ballet lessons at the age of three and continued until she was fifteen.

While she was preparing for her debut album, Karylle started rehearsals for her first stage musical, Little Mermaid, in which she played Princess Sapphire. In college, Karylle took up B.S. Management major in Communications Technology Management at the Ateneo de Manila University, where she made to the Dean's list and graduated in year 2002. Karylle is also an entrepreneur. She is the owner of the family KTV and resto-bar CenterStage at Tomas Morato in Quezon City, Jupiter in Makati City and Mall of Asia (MOA) in Pasay and part owner of Mey Lin Restaurant and The Mango Farm dessert kiosk in Greenhills, San Juan City.

Personal life
Karylle dated Dingdong Dantes in 2003 after meeting in the set of Love To Love: Sweet Exchange. She has been married to the Sponge Cola vocalist Yael Yuzon since 2014 after dating for over three years.

Music
She entered the music scene with her first album, Time to Shine from Universal Records, with the dance single "Can't Live Without You".

Her second album was released on 2005 entitled You Make Me Sing. She wrote the songs "Coz, I Love You" and "Hiling". Also included in the album is the theme song, "Mahiwagang Puso", for her hit fantaserye Encantadia, in which she starred as Sang'gre Alena.

Three years later, she released her third album Time for Letting Go under a new recording company Polyeast Records. With this album, Karylle's gifts as a distinctive powerhouse vocalist is showcased in the single, "I'll Never get Over You Getting Over Me". It is a collection of songs that give the definition of moving on and at the same time divides grief in five different stages. The album also features duet with her mom Zsa Zsa Padilla – "I Live for Your Love" and three of Karylle's original compositions, "Minamahal Kita", "Hulog ng Langit" and the soulful piano-driven "Wala Na Bang Lahat".

Her fourth album, Roadtrip, was released in 2011; she produced the album by herself. She wrote eleven tracks in this album which "narrates her personal journey". She had worked on this album for the past four years and according to one of her interviews this album represents who she is, as- the artist, singer, songwriter.

Aside from her albums Karylle also did theme songs for the movies that she starred in. She, together with Jerome John Hughes did "Pagbigyan ang Puso", for Mano Po 3 and a cover of "Sana'y Maghintay ang Walang Hanggan" for the movie Moments of Love.

Karylle's fifth album, which is simply entitled K, was launched in November 2013. This one features her dabbling into different genres. The album also includes Karylle's 2013 Philpop entry Sa’yo Na Lang Ako.  In 2015, Universal Records released Karylle Songbook containing her first two albums in one CD.

Her latest and sixth album, entitled A Different Playground, was launched in February 2016. She said that this album is a reflection on her married life. A Different Playground captures Karylle playful side as an artist.

Discography

Compilation

Soundtracks

Featured songs

Acting career

Film
Karylle's first appearance on a movie was for a cameo role in Imus Productions' Metro Manila Filmfest entry in 2002 Ang Agimat as Maria Makiling.
She also did three movies under Regal Entertainment. Mano Po 2: My Home and Mano Po 3: My Love where she played a Chinese. Her Mano Po films gave her a chance to work with the biggest and best actorlos in show business.
Bahay ni Lola 2, a horror film, was her first lead role in a movie. Karylle scored another significant career feat in GMA films' box office hit Moments of Love, which was also a finalist in the New York Film Festival. She also did indie films such as Ligaw Liham and Litsonero. Aside from playing the lead character in "Ligaw Liham", she was also one of the producers of the said film.

Television

2001–2004: Debut as TV actress
After releasing her first album, Karylle became a co-host and performer in GMA-7's now defunct program SOP. She also ventured into TV acting. Her first acting stint was in GMA 7's primetime television drama Twin Hearts as Iris. Her character would appear only for a week but then the production asked her to come back on the show to play another character Jade who looks exactly like Iris due to the chemistry that they have seen between her and actor Dingdong Dantes. It was followed by Love to Love Season 4 where she played the role of an Ilonga from Guimaras thus requiring her to speak with an Ilongo accent earning her a best actress nomination from Enpress Awards.

2008–2009: Change of network
Karylle was one of the hosts of GMA7's Pinoy Idol''' along with Rhian Ramos and Richard Gutierrez in 2008. But during the last quarter of that year, she made the big changes regarding her career. She changed her management from Genesis to STAGES, her recording company from Universal Records to Polyeast EMI, from her home grown station, GMA to its rival station ABS-CBN. Also it came as a surprise to everyone when she became an endorser of Bench Body, with her billboards seen all over the metro for the ad "Single is Sexy!" indicating that she is also changing her image. Controversies over her break-up with former co-star and boyfriend Dingdong Dantes are speculated to be what had driven her to make the move. Her last stint in GMA is her appearance in the Manny Pacquiao–Oscar De La Hoya boxing match in Las Vegas, singing the Philippine national anthem, held last December 6, 2008, in Las Vegas USA. After the event, she signed a contract with ABS-CBN and officially became a Kapamilya. The program ASAP '08 gave her a grand welcome on December 14, 2008. After joining the ABS-CBN family her star shone even brighter. In Tim Yap's column in The Philippine Star she was included in one of the 29 people to watch out for in 2009. She eventually guested in the Season 2 of top rating show I Love Betty La Fea as Olivia. ABS-CBN has given her a show Nasaan Ka Maruja? After her successful stint in the Saturday series, Karylle took on a challenging role as Denise Alferos in the 2010 International Emmy nominee for Telenovela category, Dahil May Isang Ikaw.

2010–present: International breakthrough & It's Showtime
After being busy in the concert scene for a while, she returned on the small screen as she was introduced as the new character in the daily afternoon drama Magkano ang Iyong Dangal?. After months of absence in the local scene due to her international Asian TV series The Kitchen Musical which was aired in 19 territories via AXN. Her role as Maddie in the series, earned her a nomination for Best Actress for in the 52nd Monte Carlo TV Festival. The singer-actress is back. Karylle continues to host Showtime but due to her schedule she now only appears semi regularly on ASAP. She also said that there are offers for her to do local TV series but due to her schedule she decided to turn them down. As for her international career, she landed another role in the Singaporean action-drama series Point of Entry. In 2013, she landed the role of Cinderella in Rodgers and Hammerstein's Cinderella along with Christian Bautista as Prince Christopher. Cinderella is a musical play at the Resorts World Manila. It staged sixty shows from October 2013 until December 2013. In 2016, Karylle took a short break on local television to shoot a new International TV series Private Investigator in Singapore. Karylle played the role of a pole dancer, named Maia.

Filmography

Films

 Television 

Theatre
Karylle is also known to do theater acting. She made her debut in the Trumpets' production of Little Mermaid. Her performance in the Trumpets musical is known to be her breakthrough to show business. She also starred in the Atlantis Production Seussical. Karylle bagged the female lead role as Maria, alternating with Joanna Ampil for the Stages production of West Side Story. Her performance was acclaimed by the critics and the public garnering her an Aliw Award nomination for Best Actress.

Concerts / Tours
Karylle also has time to do concerts or tours in different places nationwide / worldwide either it is Musical Related concert or not.

Writing career
Other than acting, singing, and hosting, Karylle is also known to be a writer and blogger. She write some blog about her experiences in life or give tips for different events on Yahoo. Karylle had her poem published for the first time in the 2009 February issue of S Magazine where she was also the cover. The magazine was a hot seller. After it, she now dabbles in writing as contributor for S Magazine but before that she was already a contributor writer for Philippine Star'''s Entertainment section where she shares tidbits from her travels and the events in her life. Karylle launched her own blog site in 2016.

Awards and nominations

References

External links

 
 

1981 births
Living people
Filipino women pop singers
Filipino television variety show hosts
Filipino female models
Singers from Manila
Actresses from Manila
Filipino Roman Catholics
Padilla family
ABS-CBN personalities
GMA Network personalities
Ateneo de Manila University alumni
21st-century Filipino actresses
Filipino musical theatre actresses
PolyEast Records artists